James Blackburn may refer to:
James Blackburn (architect) (1803–1854), architect and civil engineer known for his work in Australia
James Blackburn (businessman), co-founder with brother Daniel D. Blackburn of Paso Robles, California
James Blackburn (politician) (1799–1851), elected to the Legislative Assembly of Lower Canada in 1834
James Blackburn (RAF officer) (1916–1993), who served five tours in World War II
Bunkie Blackburn (James Ronald Blackburn, 1936–2006), NASCAR driver